Amblyseius similifloridanus is a species of mite in the family Phytoseiidae.

References

similifloridanus
Articles created by Qbugbot
Animals described in 1962